Mawlawi Shahzada Shahid was elected to represent Kunar Province in Afghanistan's Wolesi Jirga, the lower house of its National Legislature, in 2005.

A report on Kunar prepared at the Navy Postgraduate School stated that he was a religious scholar who studied in Pakistan.
It stated that he was "associated with Sayyaf  or Hezbi Islami (unclear) ".
It stated he sat on the counter-narcotics committee.

Shahzada joined a new group of legislators in 2010, who called themselves the "Reformists".

According to Pahjwok Afghan News Shahzada was re-elected to the Wolesi Jirga in 2010.

In February 2012 Afghan President Hamid Karzai appointed Shahzada to lead a delegation to investigate the deaths of civilians in Konar and Kapisa provinces, by NATO forces.

References

Politicians of Kunar Province
Living people
Members of the House of the People (Afghanistan)
Afghan expatriates in Pakistan
Year of birth missing (living people)